Noland Company Building is a historic building located at Newport News, Virginia. The original section was built in 1920, and is three stories in height and is a cast-in-place concrete and brick structure.  Later additions are a four-story brick addition and two-story brick addition parallel to the four-story section to create a "U" shape. The building took its present form by 1938. It features large industrial-sized windows that provide light in both the three- and four-story sections.  Until 1996, the building served as headquarters for the Noland Company, a wholesale distributor of plumbing, heating, air conditioning, refrigeration, electrical, and industrial supplies.

It was listed on the National Register of Historic Places in 2010.

References

Commercial buildings on the National Register of Historic Places in Virginia
Commercial buildings completed in 1938
Buildings and structures in Newport News, Virginia
National Register of Historic Places in Newport News, Virginia